The University of Bialystok is the largest university in the north-eastern region of Poland, educating in various fields of study, including humanities, social and natural sciences and mathematics. It has nine faculties, including a foreign one in Vilnius. Four faculties have been awarded the highest scientific category “A”. The University of Bialystok has the right to confer doctoral degrees in ten fields, as well as postdoctoral degrees in law, economics, chemistry, biology, history and physics.

Over 13,000 students are being educated in 31 fields of study, including doctoral studies and postgraduate studies. The university employs nearly 800 academics, almost 200 professors among them.

Every year the university carries out approximately 60 research projects, financed from domestic and foreign funds; it also benefits from the structural funds. Among the university's many accomplishments are its participation in 6th and 7th Framework Programme for Research, Technological Development and Demonstration, Horizon 2020, Comenius and Aspera as well as the DAPHNE III programme.

History

University of Białystok was opened on June 19, 1997. The university was established as a result of a transformation of the Branch of the University of Warsaw in Białystok after 29 years of its existence.

The university has a branch in Vilnius, Lithuania.

Foundation
The University of Bialystok Foundation, Universitas Bialostocensis - independent, non-profit, non-governmental organization located in Białystok, Poland.

Foundation was chartered on April 22, 2004, by founders from the academic circles of the University of Bialystok. Foundation is governed by an independent Board of Directors. Foundation aims organizational, material and financial support for the academic excellence and future development of the University of Bialystok. It runs such activities as: lectures, seminars, conferences, courses and workshops, business and legal consulting, participation in EU funding programs, providing financial support for academic projects and student scholarships, support students’ organizations at the University of Bialystok

Rectors
Adam Jamróz (1997–2002)
Marek Gębczyński (2002–2005)
Jerzy Nikitorowicz (2005–2012)
Leonard Etel (2012-2016)
 Robert CIborowski (since 2016)

Staff

Professors: 162
Habilitated doctors: 7
Senior lecturers: 291
Teachers (total): 348
Total staff: 808
Number of students: 15 034

International cooperation
International cooperation is also carried out based on about 200 bilateral agreements with institutions from the EU within the framework of the Erasmus programme.

As the first university in the country the University of Bialystok launched a foreign branch in Vilnius, Lithuania; the Faculty of Economics and Informatics has been created there, which educates people of mostly Polish origin, but it is also increasingly popular among the Lithuanian youth.

In 2013 the University of Bialystok initiated the creation of an international consortium of universities from Poland, Lithuania, Belarus, Ukraine and Russia under the name of Border University Network. It is composed of 10 universities. Cooperation shall include applying jointly for international grants, joint research projects, exchange of research and implementation services.

Faculties

Faculty of Biology
Faculty of Chemistry
Faculty of Economics
Faculty of Education
Faculty of History
Faculty of Law
Faculty of Mathematics
Faculty of Philology
Faculty of Physics
Faculty of Psychology
Faculty of Sociology
Faculty of Theology

References

External links
Official Foundation website

 
University of
Universities in Poland
Educational institutions established in 1997
1997 establishments in Poland